Pothundi Dam is an irrigation dam near Pothundi village in the Palakkad district of Kerala state, India. Constructed in the 19th century, it is considered one of the oldest dams in India. An unusual feature of the earth dam is the core wall, which is built with a mixture of jaggery and quick lime.

A popular festival held on the shores of the reservoir is known as the Nemmara Vallengi Vela Festival.

Topography

History
The dam, built in the 19th century for irrigation, was developed as a medium irrigation project completed in 1971 at a cost of Rs.23.425 million. The dam also provides water supply, and the reservoir has been developed as an important inland fisheries project.

Features

It has a spillway section to route the designed flood discharge. In view of favorable soil conditions, the irrigation practice under this project is a rice-based system in the Palghat plains.

The various species of river fishes found in the reservoir are murrel, catfish, tilapia, rohu (Labeo rohita), barbus, eel, common carp (Cyprinus carpio), mrigal, gourami, and catla. According to FAO statistics, the stocking is 1.241 million fingerlings per year with stocking rate of 684 fingerlings per ha per year. The fisheries development in the reservoir has been done under the Indo-German Reservoir Fisheries Development Project. The production units proposed under this project were broodfish stock, mini-hatchery, and rearing components, apart from the pens to be set up in the reservoir periphery and the floating cages offshore.

See also
 List of dams and reservoirs in India

References

Bibliography

External links

Dams in Kerala
Buildings and structures in Palakkad district
Dams completed in 1971
1971 establishments in Kerala
Bharathappuzha
20th-century architecture in India